Jagannath Chowdhary (1 January 1925 – 31 December 1999) was an Indian politician. He was elected to the Lok Sabha, the lower house of the Parliament of India from the Ballia constituency of Uttar Pradesh in 1984 as a member of the Indian National Congress defeating Chandra Sekhar.

Chowdhary died in Ballia, Uttar Pradesh on 31 December 1999, a day before his 75th birthday.

References

External links
Official biographical sketch in Parliament of India website

1925 births
1999 deaths
Indian National Congress politicians from Uttar Pradesh
Lok Sabha members from Uttar Pradesh
India MPs 1984–1989
People from Ballia district